|}

The Royal Windsor Stakes is a Listed flat horse race in Great Britain open to colts and geldings aged three years or older.
It is run at Windsor over a distance of 1 mile and 31 yards, and it is scheduled to take place each year in May.

The race was first run in 2000.

Winners

See also
 Horse racing in Great Britain
 List of British flat horse races

References

Racing Post:

Flat races in Great Britain
Windsor Racecourse
Open mile category horse races
Recurring sporting events established in 2000
2000 establishments in England